Doubletime (dbt) also known as discs overgrown (dco) is a gene that encodes the double-time protein (DBT) in Drosophila melanogaster. The double-time protein is a kinase that phosphorylates PER protein that regulates the molecularly-driven, biological clock controlling circadian rhythm. The mammalian homolog of doubletime is casein kinase I epsilon. Different mutations in the dbt gene have been shown to cause lengthening, shortening, or complete loss in period of locomotor activity in flies. Drosophila and certain vertebrate Casein Kinase Id shows circadian function that has been evolutionary conserved over long time spans.

Discovery 

Double time gene (dbt) was first identified and characterized in 1998 by Michael Young and his team at The Rockefeller University. Young's research group, headed by Jeffrey Price, published their results in a paper which characterized three alleles of dbt in fruit flies. They discovered that two mutant alleles, named short and long (dbts and dbtl, respectively) that were able to alter normal cycling of per and tim. Young's team suspected that the delay between the rise in mRNA levels of per and tim and the rise of PER and TIM protein were due to the effects of another protein. Young suspected that this protein postponed the intercellular accumulation of PER protein by destroying it. Only when PER was paired with TIM was this break-down not possible. This work showed that DBT regulated the break-down of PER.

Young named the novel gene double-time (dbt) due to its effect on the normal period of Drosophila. Mutant flies which only expressed dbts had an 18-hour period while those expressing dbtl had a 28-hour period. In addition, Young's team isolated a third allele, dbtp' which caused lethality in pupa while ablating any per or tim products in larvae.  dbtp mutants were important because they provided clues as to how the gene product functioned. Without functional DBT protein, flies accumulated high levels of PER and these PER proteins do not disintegrate in the absence of pairing with TIM protein. These mutants expressed higher cytosolic levels of PER than cells in which PER protein was associated with TIM protein.   The double-time gene regulates the expression of PER which in turns controls circadian rhythm. Young's team later cloned the dbt gene and found that the DBT protein was a kinase which specifically phosphorylated PER proteins. Thus, in dbt mutants, PER proteins were not phosphorylated by DBT protein.

Gene 

The gene is located on the right arm of chromosome 3. The mRNA transcript of dbt is 3.2 kilo-base pairs long, and it contains four exons and three introns.

Protein 

The DBT protein is composed of 440 amino acids. The protein has an ATP binding site, a serine/threonine kinase catalytic domains, and several potential phosphorylation sites, including a site for autophosphorylation.

Function

Regulation of circadian rhythm 

In Drosophila, a molecularly-driven clock mechanism works to regulate circadian rhythms such as locomotor activity and eclosion by oscillating the levels of the proteins PER and TIM via positive and negative feedback loops. The doubletime gene produces the protein DBT, a kinase that phosphorylates PER to regulate its accumulation in the cytoplasm and its degradation in the nucleus. In the cytoplasm, PER and TIM levels rise during the night, and DBT binds to PER while levels of TIM are still low. DBT phosphorylates the cytoplasmic PER, which leads to its degradation. Only once TIM accumulates do PER and TIM bind, and this binding inhibits the degradation of PER. This cytoplasmic PER degradation and then accumulation causes the 4-6 hour delay seen between the levels of per mRNA and the levels of PER protein. The PER/TIM complex, still bound to DBT, migrates into the nucleus where it suppresses the transcription of per and tim. TIM is lost from the complex, and DBT then phosphorylates PER which leads to its degradation, allowing for the transcription of the clock and clock-controlled genes (those with transcription controlled by circadian mechanisms). The oscillations in the PER and TIM proteins presence causes oscillations in their own and other genes' expression, which is the basis for circadian rhythmicity.

The transcription of dbt mRNA and the levels of the DBT protein are consistent throughout the day and not controlled by PER/TIM levels. However, the location and concentration of DBT protein within the cell changes throughout the day.  It is consistently present in the nucleus at varying levels, but in the cytoplasm it is predominantly present in the late day and early night, when PER and TIM levels are peaking

Before DBT begins phosphorylating PER, a different protein called NEMO/NLK kinase begins phosphorylating PER at its per-short domain. This phosphorylation stimulates DBT to begin phosphorylating PER at multiple nearby sites. In total, there are about 25-30 phosphorylation sites on PER. The phosphorylated PER binds to the F-box protein SLIMB, and it is then targeted for degradation through the ubiquitin-proteasome pathway. Therefore, the phosphorylation of PER by DBT leads to a decrease in PER abundance, which is a necessary step in the function of the organism's internal clock.

The activity of DBT on PER is aided by the activity of the proteins CKII and SGG, and it is antagonized by a rhythmically expressed protein phosphatase. It is possible, but currently unknown, if DBT regulates other functions of PER or of other circadian proteins. There has been no evidence that suggests that DBT binds directly to TIM. Rather, the only kinase known to directly phosphorylate TIM is the SHAGGY (SGG) kinase protein, but this does not majorly affect TIM stability, suggesting the presence of a different kinase or phosphatase. DBT does play a role in recruiting other kinases into PER repression complexes. These kinases phosphorylate the transcription factor CLK, which releases the CLK-CYC complex from the E-Box and represses transcription.

Mutant alleles 

There are three primary mutant alleles of dbt: dbtS, which shortens the organism's free-running period (its internal period in constant light conditions); dbtL, which lengthens the free-running period; and dbtP, which causes pupal lethality and eliminates circadian cycling proteins and per and tim transcription. All mutants except for dbtS produce differential PER degradation that directly correspond with their phenotypic behavior. DbtS PER degradation resembles wild-type DBT, which suggests that dbtS does not affect the clock through this degradation mechanism. It has been suggested that dbtS works by acting as a repressor or producing a different phosphoylation pattern of the substrate. DbtS causes early termination of per transcription.

The dbtL mutation causes the period of PER and TIM oscillations, as well as animal behavioral activity, to lengthen to about 27 hours. This extended rhythm is caused by a decreased rate of phosphorylation of PER due to lower DBT kinase activity levels. This mutation is caused by a substitution in the protein sequence (Met-80→Ile mutation). The dbtS mutation causes a PER/TIM oscillation period of 18–20 hours. There is no current evidence for the mechanism affected by the mutation, but it is caused by a substitution in the protein sequence (Pro-47→ Ser mutation).

Another dbt mutation is dbtAR, which causes arrhythmic activities in Drosophila. It a hypermorphic allele that is the result of a His 126→Tyr mutation. Homozygous flies with this mutation are viable but arrhythmic, whereas dbtAR/+ heterozygotes have extra-long periods of about 29 hours, and their DBT kinase activity is reduced to the lowest rate of all of the DBT alleles.

Noncircadian 

Clock gene mutations, including those to Drosophila's dbt, alter the sensitization of drug-induced locomotor activity after repeated exposure to psychostimulants. Drosophila with mutant alleles of dbt failed to display locomotor sensitization in response to repeated cocaine exposure. Additionally, there is experimental evidence for this gene to function in 13 unique biological processes, including biological regulation, phosphorus metabolic process, establishment of planar polarity, positive regulation of biological process, cellular process, single-organism developmental process, response to stimulus, response to organic substance, sensory organ development, macromolecule modification, growth, cellular component organization or biogenesis, and rhythmic process. The gene's alternative name, discs overgrown, refers to its role as a cell growth regulating gene that has strong effects of cell survival and growth control in imaginal discs, an attribute of the larvae fly stage. The protein is necessary in the mechanism linking cell survival during proliferation and growth arrest.

Noncatalytic 

The DBT protein may play a noncatalytic role in attracting kinases that phosphorylate CLOCK (CLK), an activator of transcription. DBT has a noncatalytic role in recruiting kinases, some of which have not yet been discovered, into the transcription translation feedback loop (TTFL). DBT's catalytic activity is not affiliated with the phosphorylation CLK or its transcriptional repression. PER phosphorylation by DBT is integral in repressing CLK-dependent transcription. The DBT protein plays a noncatalytic role in recruiting additional kinases that phosphorylate CLK indirectly, thus downregulating transcription. A similar pathway exists in mammals due to the mechanistic conservation of the CKI homolog. In 2004, In dbts and dbtl mutants, Drosophila cells has reduced CKI-7 activity.

Mammalian homologs

Casein kinase I 
The casein kinase 1 (CKI) family of kinases is a highly conserved group of proteins that are found in organisms from Arabidopsis, to Drosophila, to humans. Because dbt is a member of this family, questions arose about the role of these related genes in other model systems. Within mammals, there are seven CKI isoforms, all with various roles surrounding the phosphorylation of proteins. CKIε was found to be most homologous to dbt, with a similarity of 86%. Along with this genetic similarity, the proteins have been found to be functionally homologous. Just as phosphorylation by dbt in Drosophila targets PER proteins for proteasome degradation, CKIε phosphorylation reduces the stability of mammalian PER proteins, labeling them for degradation. However, while dbt and CKIε do play similar roles in their respective organisms, studies looking at the effectiveness of CKIε in Drosophila have shown that they are not completely functionally interchangeable. Nonetheless, the functions are extremely similar. Specifically, CKIε has been shown to reduce the half-life of mPER1, one of the three mammalian PER homologs. In addition, nuclear localization of the mPER proteins is related to phosphorylation, adding another essential role to the activity of the CKIε protein. Overall, the genetic similarity of dbt and CKIε is not the end of the story; the roles they play within the circadian clock in their respective systems are almost identical. Both are involved with periodic phosphorylation, regulating the oscillations of the circadian clocks.

The casein kinase 1 (CKI) family of kinases is a highly conserved group of proteins that are found in organisms from Arabidopsis, to Drosophila, to humans. Because dbt is a member of this family, questions arose about the role of these related genes in other model systems. Within mammals, there are seven CKI isoforms, all with various roles surrounding the phosphorylation of proteins. CKIε was found to be most homologous to dbt, with a similarity of 86%. Along with this genetic similarity, the proteins have been found to be functionally homologous. Just as phosphorylation by dbt in Drosophila targets PER proteins for proteasome degradation, CKIε phosphorylation reduces the stability of mammalian PER proteins, labeling them for degradation. However, while dbt and CKIε do play similar roles in their respective organisms, studies looking at the effectiveness of CKIε in Drosophila have shown that they are not completely functionally interchangeable. Nonetheless, the functions are extremely similar. Specifically, CKIε has been shown to reduce the half-life of mPER1, one of the three mammalian PER homologs. In addition, nuclear localization of the mPER proteins is related to phosphorylation, adding another essential role to the activity of the CKIε protein. Overall, the genetic similarity of dbt and CKIε is not the end of the story; the roles they play within the circadian clock in their respective systems are almost identical. Both are involved with periodic phosphorylation, regulating the oscillations of the circadian clocks.

Role of CKIε 

Initially, the role of CKIε within the circadian clock of mammals was discovered as the result of a mutation in hamsters. The tau mutation in the Syrian golden hamster was the first to show a heritable abnormality of circadian rhythms in mammals. Hamsters with the mutation exhibit a shorter period than the wild-type. Heterozygotes have a period of about 22h while the period of homozygotes is even shorter, at about 20h. Because of previous research indicating the role of dbt in establishing period, the tau mutation was found to be at the same locus as the CKIε gene. Thus, this mutation relates to the mutations dbtS and dbtL, which both effect the internal period of the fly. However, it seems that the forces driving these changes in period are different. It was found that the point mutation resulting in the tau mutant decreased the activity of the CKIε kinase in vitro. In flies, on the other hand, the dbtL mutation is associated with a decrease in dbt activity and a longer period. This is consistent with another experiment done on hamsters that showed a lengthening of the period caused by CKI inhibition. To investigate this discrepancy, researchers studied the half-life of PER2 under the influence of wild-type CKIε, CKIεtau, and CKIε (K38A) which is a kinase-inactive mutant. The results indicated that the tau mutation was actually a gain-of-function mutation, instead of loss-of-function, that caused the more rapid degradation of the PER proteins. Therefore, the tau mutation in hamsters can be seen as similar to mutations in dbt that change the internal period.

Importance of rhythmic phosphorylation 

A role of CKIε has also been seen in humans related to Familial Advanced Sleep Phase Syndrome, in which individuals have a much shorter period than the typical human. In this case, it does not seem to be a mutation of the CKIε protein itself, but instead in the binding site for phosphorylation of the PER2 protein.

In addition, kinase activity has been shown to be involved in the nuclear localization of PER and other genes involved in circadian rhythmicity. Therefore, it is this phosphorylation that allows PER to repress its own transcription and place a delay on the circadian system. Without the phosphorylation of PER, by dbt in Drosophila or by CKIε in mammals, there would be no oscillations because the feedback loop would be broken.

It has even been proposed that this rhythmic phosphorylation itself might be a driving factor of circadian clocks. Up to this point, the transcription-translation negative feedback loop has been identified as the source of oscillations and rhythms in biological clocks. But, experiments with phosphorylation of the cyanobacterial protein KaiC in vitro showed that rhythms persisted without the presence of any transcription or translation. Therefore, kinases like dbt and CKIε might play even more important roles within circadian clocks than just targeting proteins for degradation.

See also
Period (gene)
Timeless (gene)
Kinase

References

External links 
 

Chronobiology
Protein kinases
Circadian rhythm